The Women's team sprint competition at the 2021 UCI Track Cycling World Championships was held on 20 October 2021.

Results

Qualifying
The qualifying was started at 18:30. All teams advanced to the first round.

First round
First round heats were held as follows:
Heat 1: 4th v 5th fastest
Heat 2: 3rd v 6th fastest
Heat 3: 2nd v 7th fastest
Heat 4: 1st v 8th fastest (cancelled and both teams raced alone)

The first round was started at 19:53. The heat winners were ranked on time, from which the top two advanced to the gold medal race and the other two proceeded to the bronze medal race.

 QG = qualified for gold medal final
 QB = qualified for bronze medal final

Finals
The finals were started at 20:51.

References

Women's team sprint
UCI Track Cycling World Championships – Women's team sprint